The Third is the third studio album by English trio Kitty, Daisy & Lewis. It was released in March 2015 under Sunday Best Recordings.

Track listing

Charts

References

2015 albums